"Bruane brenn" ("the bridges are burning") is a song by Norwegian heavy metal band Kvelertak. It is a track of the band's second album Meir. The single was premiered on 8 January 2013 on BBC Radio 1's "Rock Show" with Daniel P. Carter and was released on iTunes and Spotify in Scandinavia on 21 January and elsewhere on 28 January. The artwork was created by Seldon Hunt. A music video for the song was released in February 2013.

Personnel
Kvelertak
 Erlend Hjelvik – vocals
 Vidar Landa – guitar
 Bjarte Lund Rolland – guitar, vocals
 Maciek Ofstad – guitar, vocals
 Marvin Nygaard – bass
 Kjetil Gjermundrød – drums

Production
 Kurt Ballou – mixing, production
 Seldon Hunt – artwork

References

 

2013 singles
2013 songs
Kvelertak songs